The 1903 Iowa State Senate elections were the last state legislative general elections held on an odd-numbered year. Iowa voters elected state senators in 29 of the state senate's 50 districts. State senators traditionally serve four-year terms in the Iowa State Senate. However, under the Biennial Elections law enacted in 1904 by the Iowa General Assembly, the senators elected in 1903 served an additional fifth year (until the 1908 elections) to accommodate the transition to holding elections on even-numbered years.

A statewide map of the 50 state Senate districts in the 1903 elections is provided by the Iowa General Assembly here.

The 1903 elections occurred before primary elections were established in Iowa by the Primary Election Law in 1907. The general election took place on November 3, 1903.

Following the previous election, Republicans had control of the Iowa Senate with 39 seats to Democrats' 11 seats. However, during the twenty-ninth session of the Iowa General Assembly, the senators decided in March 1902 to decertify Democrat Joseph Martin Emmert of district eighteen and replace Emmert with Republican James E. Bruce, thus flipping the seat from Democratic to Republican control. Therefore, going into Election Day in 1903, Republicans held an advantage of 40 seats to Democrats' 10 seats.

To claim control of the chamber from Republicans, the Democrats needed to net 16 Senate seats.

Republicans maintained control of the Iowa State Senate following the 1903 general election with the balance of power shifting to Republicans holding 42 seats and Democrats having 8 seats (a net gain of 2 seats for Republicans).

Summary of Results
Note: The 21 holdover Senators not up for re-election are not listed on this table.

Source:

Detailed Results
NOTE: The 21 districts that did not hold elections in 1903 are not listed here.

District 2

District 3

District 4

District 5

District 6

District 8

District 11

District 14

District 15

District 16

District 17

District 19

District 23

District 24

District 25

District 26

District 27

District 28

District 31

District 32

District 33

District 36

District 39

District 40

District 41

District 43

District 46

District 47

District 49

See also
 Elections in Iowa

References

Iowa Senate
Iowa
Iowa Senate elections